Apomorphomyia is a genus of bristle flies in the family Tachinidae. There is at least one described species in Apomorphomyia, A. lygaeidophaga.

References

Further reading

External links

 
 

Phasiinae

Taxa named by Roger Ward Crosskey